The 1974 NCAA Skiing Championships were contested at the Jackson Hole Mountain Resort in Jackson Hole, Wyoming at the 21st annual NCAA-sanctioned ski tournament to determine the individual and team national champions of men's collegiate alpine skiing, cross-country skiing, and ski jumping in the United States.

Two-time defending champion Colorado, coached by alumnus Bill Marolt, captured their fifth national championship, finishing six points ahead of runner-up Wyoming in the team standings. 

Repeat champions were Denver's Peik Christensen (alpine) and Steiner Hybertsen (cross country) of Wyoming.

Venue

This year's NCAA championships were held March 7–9 in Wyoming at Jackson Hole. The 21st edition, these were the first in Wyoming.

Team scoring

Individual events
Four events were held, which yielded six individual titles.
Thursday: Downhill, Cross Country
Friday: Slalom
Saturday: Jumping

See also
List of NCAA skiing programs

References

NCAA Skiing Championships
NCAA Skiing Championships
NCAA Skiing Championships
NCAA Skiing Championships
NCAA Skiing Championships
NCAA Skiing Championships
NCAA Skiing Championships
Skiing in Wyoming